Steven C. Rockefeller Jr. is an American businessman in the financial industry and is the chairman and CEO of the Rose Rock Group, a global investment management firm established by members of the Rockefeller family.  Rockefeller is the son of Steven Clark Rockefeller and the grandson of former U.S. Vice President Nelson Rockefeller.

Career

Prior to Rock Capital Group, Rockefeller served as Managing Director of Deutsche Bank Private Wealth Management and was a key founder of the Deutsche Bank Microcredit Development Fund, a unique partnership between the bank and its clients to support microcredit programs worldwide.

Rockefeller served as a member of the Board of Directors at Grameen Foundation for seven years. He also served on the Foundation's Development Committee, where he focused on technical support, fundraising, micro-credit programs and public health service.  Rockefeller received a Fulbright Award in 2005 in recognition of his dedicated service to poverty alleviation and longstanding support of micro-credit programs.

Education
Rockefeller received a bachelor's degree from Fairfield University in 1985 and his master's degree in public and private management from the Yale School of Management in 1990.

Personal
Rockefeller and his wife, Kimberly, live in Pleasantville, New York, with their three children, Steven III, Christian, and Kayla.

References 

Living people
Rockefeller family
American philanthropists
Fairfield University alumni
Yale School of Management alumni
Microfinance people
People from Pleasantville, New York
Year of birth missing (living people)